Edwin Warfield (May 7, 1848March 31, 1920) was an American politician and a member of the United States Democratic Party, and the 45th Governor of Maryland in the United States from 1904 to 1908.

Early life 
Edwin Warfield was born to Albert G. Warfield and Margaret Gassaway Warfield at the "Oakdale" plantation in Howard County, Maryland.  He received early education at the public schools of Howard County and at St. Timothy's Hall (formerly an Episcopal Church institution, now known as St. Timothy's School) in Catonsville, Maryland, a "streetcar suburb", southwest of Baltimore in Baltimore County. In 1877 he became a professor at Maryland's Agricultural College. Although Maryland was a Union State, many families were southern sympathizers, two of Warfield's brothers served in the Confederate States Army. Gassaway Watkins Warfield died at Camp Chase, and Albert G Warfield Jr. survived the conflict. After the abolition of slavery in the United States, Warfield had to return home frequently to help run his family's estate.  He also spent time as a teacher in the county schools, and, in his spare time, studied for admission to the bar. Warfield founded The Daily Record as a court/legal proceedings, financial/commercial and business newspaper in 1888. It has continued into the 21st Century along with a corresponding "Warfield's" magazine published during the 1980s-90's. By his father, he was a third cousin to the Duchess of Windsor (originally named/née Bessie Wallis Warfield, later Wallis Warfield Simpson of Baltimore), wife of the abdicated king of the United Kingdom, King Edward VIII, later Prince Edward, Duke of Windsor in 1936–1937, which gained world-wide attention and coverage, seventeen years after the former Governor's death. Warfield's lineage also allowed him membership into the Sons of the American Revolution, where he served as 8th President General from 1902 until 1903.

Political career 
In 1874, Warfield was appointed to the office of Register of Wills for Howard County to fill a vacancy. He was elected to a full six-year term the following year, and served until 1881. He was appointed to the Maryland Senate following the resignation of Arthur Pue Gorman to accept a higher office, was re-elected in 1883, and served as President of the Maryland State Senate during the 1886 session.

While in the Senate, Warfield began his own law practice in Ellicott City, Maryland, and purchased the Ellicott City Times, where he served as editor from 1882 to 1886. He also founded a bank in the town where he worked until 1890.

During the 1884 Presidential election, Warfield made significant contributions to the campaign of the 22nd (and later also 24th) President Grover Cleveland in Maryland, the first Democratic president to be elected since before the Civil War.  Following the election, Cleveland appointed Warfield to serve as Surveyor of the Port of Baltimore beginning April 5, 1885.  Warfield served in that position until May 1, 1890, after the Republicans returned to power.  In 1890, Warfield married Emma Nicodemus, with whom he had three daughters and one son.

In 1890, after his removal from Surveyor, Warfield founded the Fidelity and Deposit Company, where he served as president until his death. He was chosen as a delegate to the 1896 Democratic National Convention, but otherwise remained out of politics for nearly a decade.

In September 1903, because of his political and historical interests, Warfield served as the main speaker and orator for the ceremonies dedicating the Lt. Col. William H. Watson (1808–1846) Monument.

Governor of Maryland 

Warfield chose to run for Governor of Maryland in 1899, but lost the Democratic nomination after he was opposed by influential Maryland politicians, including Arthur Pue Gorman, a powerful U.S. Senator who had his own state political machine and was allied to similar interests and "old pols" in Baltimore City.  However, even though it was apparent the party bosses did not hold him in favor, he again sought the nomination in 1903 openly discouraging African-Americans' ability to vote.  He was successfully nominated by the party, and defeated his Republican opponent, Stevenson A. Williams, by over 12,600 votes.  He was inaugurated as the 45th Governor of the "Old Line State" on January 13, 1904.

The most significant event of his tenure as Governor came when Arthur Pue Gorman, who had opposed Warfield's election, proposed the "Poe Amendment" to the Maryland State Constitution of 1867, which would have disenfranchised most black voters in the state.  The bill easily passed the Democrat-controlled General Assembly, but Warfield refused to support the proposed amendment and delayed placing it before the voters.  While Warfield was in favor of some of the amendment's provisions, such as denying the vote to the less-educated black voters of the state, he feared it would eventually lead to greater levels of disenfranchisement which could threaten all voters in the state.  The proposed amendment was put before voters in a 1904 referendum, and was defeated by 30,000 votes, a defeat to the crypto-segregationists in the party in which Warfield played a major role.  Warfield's actions in this affair further alienated him from the Democratic machine in Maryland, which was openly hostile towards him by the time he left office.

As governor, Warfield also favored the establishment of direct-voting for U.S. Senators.  He argued this before the General Assembly in 1906, believing the power should be in the hands of the people.  The direct election of senators eventually became national law with the Seventeenth Amendment to the United States Constitution.  Other accomplishments as governor included the authorization and approval in 1904 of an official state Flag of Maryland, (by using the design and colors on the shield of the Calvert family's coat-of-arms with a red-and-white cross with bottony (trefoil) ends of the Crosslands and the black-and-gold chevrons of the Calverts, each in two alternating quarters, like the shield. During the previous Civil War, the severely divided Border State used the two elements of the Maryland shield to represent their side of the War, (Unionists wore black/gold chevrons and Confederate Marylanders wore badges with red/white crosses on their uniforms. The return of a quartered flag and seal and shield represented a reuniting of the "Old Line State" and was fostered by the newly re-organized militia as the Maryland National Guard flying the new/old Maryland flag.  Another historical "final act" was the success of a long search and process by the then U.S. Ambassador to France to discover the whereabouts in Paris, France of an American naval hero's burial site and have the return of the body of American Revolutionary War Captain John Paul Jones, (1747–1792), considered the father of the United States Navy to the specially-prepared marble crypt under the newly constructed domed chapel at the U. S. Naval Academy in Annapolis, Maryland. Also the western expansion and annex construction (with two new marble chambers for the houses of the General Assembly of Maryland) along with the remodeling of the old Maryland State House on State Circle, including the Old Senate Chamber to match its original Colonial appearance when General George Washington resigned his position in the Continental Army at the State House in December 1784, then serving as a temporary national capitol with the Confederation Congress then meeting there. Warfield left office in January 1908.

Later life and legacy 
After his tenure as governor, Warfield returned to his previous activities.  He became president of the Fidelity Trust Company with Baltimore Sun Publisher Van Lear Black. He served on the board of the Montgomery Mutual Insurance Company until his death. In addition to retaining his presidency at the Fidelity and Deposit Company.  He was a prominent member of the Maryland Club and also served as president of the Maryland Historical Society. Warfield was proud of his families Confederate legacy, representing Maryland in reunions and events like the 1911 Southern commercial congress in Atlanta.

Warfield's health began to deteriorate in late 1919, and he was confined to his home in Baltimore during the last few months of his life.  He died there, and was interred in his family burial ground at "Cherry Grove" in Howard County.

Warfield was eulogized by The Sun of Baltimore not as a man who made definitive accomplishments, but for standing up to the Democratic machine and supporting the public interest, and for transforming the office of the governor into a more modern institution responsible to the public, not the party.

On 23 September 1948, Edwin Warfield Jr. commemorated a memorial at the Howard County Courthouse to honor the Confederate soldiers from Howard County.

In Columbia, Maryland, Governor Warfield is remembered with a street named for him, Governor Warfield Parkway. In 1914, a dredge named the Gov. Warfield helped to dig the Cape Cod Canal in Massachusetts.

References

External links 
 Picture Confederate Reunion, Including Governor Edwin Warfield, 10 June 1899

1848 births
1920 deaths
Democratic Party governors of Maryland
Presidents of the Maryland State Senate
Democratic Party Maryland state senators
People from Woodbine, Maryland
People from Catonsville, Maryland
People from Ellicott City, Maryland
Sons of the American Revolution
19th-century American politicians
20th-century American politicians
Edwin